Alamal Sports Club Atbara is a Sudanese football club based in Atbara. They play in the top division in Sudanese football, Sudan Premier League. Their home stadium is Stade Al-Amal Atbara.

Performance in CAF competitions
 CAF Confederation Cup: 3 appearances
 2010: First Round of 16
 2012: First Round of 16
 2020–21: First round

Players

References

External links
Team profile – Goalzz.com

1946 establishments in Sudan
Football clubs in Sudan